Estera was a global provider of corporate, trust, fund and accounting services. The company was created following a management buyout of the fiduciary group of Appleby. It rebranded as Estera in April 2016. In February 2020 Estera merged with Ocorian.

Estera employed 550 people and had offices in 11 jurisdictions: Bermuda, British Virgin Islands, Cayman Islands, Guernsey, Hong Kong, Isle of Man, Jersey, Luxembourg, Malta, Mauritius, United Kingdom.

Gary O'Connor, the managing director of Estera Trust (Isle of Man) Limited, was shortlisted for the Institute of Directors Young Director of the Year award in September 2017. In July 2019, it was announced that Estera would be merged with Inflexion Private Equity's company Ocorian.

History
In December 2015, "Appleby Fiduciary Business (AFB)", a Bermuda registered company and a branch of the law firm Appleby, was separated out legally from Appleby (Bermuda) through a management buy out by the private equity firm "Bridgepoint". In April 2016, it changed its name to "Estera", with the Group Chief Executive Officer being Farah Ballands.  The company has offices in 11 locations.

The name of the new company was chosen based on inputs from their staff.

Estera was involved in the Paradise Papers leak.

Subsequent acquisitions
In 2017, Estera acquired Morgan Sharpe (in Guernsey), Heritage financial services group (in Belfast and Malta) and Headstart s.a.r.l (Luxembourg).

See also
Asiaciti Trust
Ocorian

References

External links

Financial services companies of Bermuda
Financial services companies established in 2015
Companies formed by management buyout
Paradise Papers
2015 establishments in North America